Ieva Sargautytė (born 1981 in Vilnius) is a Lithuanian orienteering competitor. She received a bronze medal in relay at the 2002 European Orienteering Championships in Sümeg, together with Giedrė Voverienė and Vilma Rudzenskaitė. The same Lithuanian team finished 4th at the 2003 World Orienteering Championships in Rapperswil-Jona.

Sargautyte finished 7th in the sprint distance at the 2004 World Orienteering Championships in Västerås.

References

External links
 
 Ieva Sargautytė at World of O Runners

1981 births
Living people
Sportspeople from Vilnius
Lithuanian orienteers
Female orienteers
Foot orienteers
Competitors at the 2005 World Games
Junior World Orienteering Championships medalists